Forsyth Technical Community College, (Forsyth Tech) is a public community college in Winston-Salem, North Carolina. The college is one of the largest in the North Carolina Community College System, with an enrollment of over 11,000 credit students and over 24,000 Corporate and Continuing Education students.

The college has twelve locations in Forsyth and Stokes counties and offers many distance learning classes and specialty programs in addition to 67 Associates in Applied Science degrees, 20 college transfer (Associates in Arts and Associates in Science) degrees, 35 diplomas, and 67 certificates.

Under the leadership of Dr. Bob H. Greene (May 25, 1936 – July 14, 2011), the community college grew at an unprecedented rate, adding two new facilities and gaining further prestige in the Winston-Salem community.

Forsyth Tech was briefly mentioned in President Barack Obama's 2011 State of the Union Address as an example of education reform in low-income and low-opportunity areas. President Obama visited the school to give a speech on October 6, 2010.

Early College Of Forsyth and Middle College Of Forsyth are high school programs on the Forsyth Tech campus in which students take community college classes, and earn an associate degree by graduation of high school. The high school's calendar is the same as Forsyth Tech.

References

External links 
 Official website

Two-year colleges in the United States
North Carolina Community College System colleges
Universities and colleges in Winston-Salem, North Carolina
Universities and colleges accredited by the Southern Association of Colleges and Schools
Education in Forsyth County, North Carolina
Education in Stokes County, North Carolina